"Mr. Me Too" is a song by American hip hop duo Clipse, released on May 23, 2006 as the lead single from their second studio album Hell Hath No Fury (2006). The song features guest vocals and production by American musician Pharrell Williams. It is considered to be diss track aimed at fellow American rapper Lil Wayne, after he graced the cover of Vibe magazine with A Bathing Ape hoodie, a brand which was at that time popularized by Clipse. Lyrically, the song is a braggadocio rap record, where the rappers boast about their fashion and style, while denouncing imitators.

Background
On MTV, Pusha T explained the song's meaning: "It's the total disruption of radio. There's nothing on radio that will even be close to it. It just addresses Mr. Me Toos. Mr. Me Too is the person that sits there and examines your style and takes a piece of it. Also taken from the stage name Justin Meetoo. It addresses the competitive dude on the street who, when you get this or that they're like, 'Me too.'" He also said that the track also touches on some of what they went through with their label: "Briefly, 'cause we don't dwell."

The song also contains a reference to record label Jive, where Pusha T apologizes for the constant album delays ("These are the days of our lives / And I'm sorry to the fans but those crackers weren't playin' fair at Jive.") There was a W.V. boy working alongside them.

Music video
The music video was directed by Daren Jackson. The video features cameo appearances from Re-Up Gang, Gillie Da Kid, and Bump J of Major Figgas.

Charts

Personnel
Written by Gene Thorton, Terrence Thornton, Ian McNeally and Pharrell Williams
Produced by The Neptunes
All instruments by The Neptunes
Original Compositions from Preacha related to 10th Ave. Productions

References

2006 singles
Clipse songs
Pharrell Williams songs
Jive Records singles
Song recordings produced by the Neptunes
Songs written by Pusha T
Songs written by Pharrell Williams
Songs written by Chad Hugo